Tyler Sargent is an American bassist and former backing vocalist for the indie rock band, Clap Your Hands Say Yeah.

He attended college at Connecticut College along with the other members of Clap Your Hands Say Yeah prior to the group's formation. He attended high school at Milton Academy.  He is also the twin brother of CYHSY keyboardist/guitarist/backing vocalist Lee Sargent.

In 2008, Sargent performed on James Lavino's score to the Alex Karpovsky film Woodpecker.  The soundtrack also featured performances by Sargent's brother Lee and by Radiohead bass player Colin Greenwood.

On July 6, 2012, Sargent announced that he would be leaving Clap Your Hands Say Yeah.

References

Year of birth missing (living people)
Living people
American male singers
American rock singers
American male bass guitarists
American rock bass guitarists
Connecticut College alumni
Milton Academy alumni